Furnessville is an unincorporated community in Pine Township, Porter County, in the U.S. state of Indiana.

History
A post office was established at Furnessville in 1861, and remained in operation until 1919. The community was named after Edwin L. Furness, a local postmaster.

Geography

References

Populated places established in 1861
1861 establishments in Indiana
Unincorporated communities in Porter County, Indiana
Unincorporated communities in Indiana